Clio Cosmetics is a South Korean cosmetics company based in Seongdong District, Seoul, South Korea.

Brands 
 Clio Professional is a professional make up brand since 1993 with the philosophy of "Practical Professional" providing easy-use products but excellent performance. 
 Peripera is a make up brand for young girls since 2005 with fun, pop, trendy images of "Instant Beauty"
 Goodal is a Korean natural skin care brand since 2011 using fermented ingredients and infused water.
 Healing bird is a botanical hair and body care brand with  silicone free ingredients and various fragrance experiences of flower garden.

History 
Clio Cosmetics is a Korean cosmetic company founded in 1993 starting a professional make-up brand "Clio Professional".

Over time, the company branched out into other make-up, skin care, hair and body care products. CLIO cosmetics launched Peripera in 2005, Goodal in 2011 and Healing bird in 2017.

In 2012, Clio cosmetics opened the stand alone shop Club Clio selling all of its own brands (95 stores as of year end 2016).

In 2016, CLIO cosmetics successfully received funding of 50 million USD from L-capital Asia, a private equity investment firm which is affiliated with LVMH

In July 2016, CLIO Cosmetics went public on the KOSDAQ.

Spokespersons and models 
 An Yu-jin (2022–)
 Aespa (2021–)
 Go Min-si (2021–)
 Stray Kids (2021)
 Kim Woo-seok (2020–2021)
 Krystal Jung (2018–2020)
 Gong Hyo-jin (2015–2017)
 Sandara Park (2013–2014)
 Lee Hyo-ri (2011–2012)
 Kim Ha-neul (2010)

References

External links 
 Clio Cosmetics 
 Clio Professional 
 Peripera 
 Goodal 

Companies based in Seoul
Cosmetics brands of South Korea
South Korean companies established in 1993
Manufacturing companies established in 1993